The Sleeping Mountain is an adventure novel by English author John Harris.

Publication history
 1959, UK, Companion Book Club ASIN B001H03S3I, 1 Jan 1959, Hardcover 
 1969, UK, Longman  , Dec 1969, Paperback
 1972, UK, Hutchinson  , 29 Aug 1972, Hardcover 288 pages
 1976, Ulverscroft Large Print Books Ltd  , Oct 1976, Hardcover 502 pages
 2001, UK, House of Stratus  , 31 July 2001, Paperback 318 pages

References

External links 
 Cover image at fantasticfiction

1958 British novels
English adventure novels
Hutchinson (publisher) books